2-Hydroxy-4-methylbenzaldehyde is a chemical compound. It is an additives in cigarettes.

References 

Hydroxybenzaldehydes